Toscaig is a small, remote village, at the southern end of the Applecross peninsula, in Wester Ross in the Highlands of Scotland. Toscaig is in the Highland council area, and lies at the head of the south facing sea loch, Loch Toscaig, which in turn links with the Inner Sound.

The village of Applecross lies 5 miles to the north of Toscaig, along the coastal road via the hamlets of Camusterrach and Camusteel.

Toscaig once had a ferry service, linking to Kyle of Lochalsh. This service operated between 1955 and 1978, and was the only route into Applecross when the road over the Bealach na Bà was closed.

References

Populated places in Ross and Cromarty